Bebe, or Naami, is an Eastern Beboid language of Cameroon. According to Ethnologue, it's 85% lexically similar to Kemezung.

References

 Blench, Roger, 2011. 'The membership and internal structure of Bantoid and the border with Bantu'. Bantu IV, Humboldt University, Berlin.
Brye, Edward and Elizabeth Brye. 2004. "Intelligibility testing survey of Bebe and Kemezung and synthesis of sociolinguistic research of the Eastern Beboid cluster." SIL Electronic Survey Reports 2004-011: 18 p. http://www.sil.org/silesr/abstract.asp?ref=2004-011

Beboid languages
Languages of Cameroon